Nickelodeon is a children's channel broadcasting in Denmark, Norway and Finland. It broadcasts programming from the similarly branded channels in the United Kingdom and the United States as well as a few locally produced programmes.

History
The channel started broadcasting in 1996 as a part of the analogue Viasat package, only broadcasting in the morning, sharing one transponder on Sirius 1 (previously Marcopolo 1) with ZTV and one on TV Sat 2 shared with 3+ and other Danish channels. The official launch was on 1 February 1997. Initially it was only broadcasting for six hours between 7 a.m. and 1 p.m. A few years later, it switched to another transponder, allowing it to broadcast between 6 a.m. and 6 p.m.

Nickelodeon was launched as a free-to-air television channel in Sweden in 2001 and in Finland on 1 September 2007.

On 18 June 2008, a separate channel for Sweden was launched. Nickelodeon Sweden replaced the pan-Nordic channel in all of the country. The pan-Nordic does however continue to be available in Denmark, Finland and Norway.

A Danish version, Nickelodeon Denmark, was launched in March 2008. It was launched with VH1 Denmark, which aired Nickelodeon for six hours in the morning. The Pan-Nordic version is still available to Danish satellite viewers.

In 2011, the channel started broadcasting commercials in Norwegian, despite also being available in Denmark and Finland at the time.

On 7 January 2013, Viacom launched a Finnish version of Nick Jr. which replaced Nickelodeon Scandinavia on cable and in the terrestrial network. Nickelodeon Scandinavia continues to be available on satellite in Finland.

Broadcast
Most cartoons are dubbed into local languages, and separate audio tracks are available on satellite. Non-cartoon series aimed an older audience is broadcast in English with local subtitles.

The limited broadcasting hours meant that the channel usually shared bandwidth with other channels who would broadcast in the evening and the night. On Viasat, it used to broadcast on the same channel as Viasat Nature, Viasat Crime and Playboy TV, but this was changed in 2007 when Viasat Nature started broadcasting in the day and Nickelodeon would timeshare with VH1 instead. Many cable systems took the Viasat feed.

On Canal Digital, the European version of VH1 Classic is broadcast in the downtime, and on Swedish DTT (Boxer). Star! was once shown during the same time.

The channel was previously broadcast from the United Kingdom, but in 2008 it handed back its UK license and started broadcasting from the Netherlands instead.

References

External links
 Nickelodeon Norway

Scandinavia
Children's television networks
Broadcasting in the Netherlands
Pan-Nordic television channels
Television stations in Denmark
Television channels in Norway
Television channels in Finland
Television channels and stations established in 1996
1996 establishments in Europe
Television channel articles with incorrect naming style
1996 establishments in Sweden
1996 establishments in Denmark
1996 establishments in Norway
1996 establishments in Finland
Television in the Nordic countries